Palaquium pseudorostratum is a tree in the family Sapotaceae. The specific epithet pseudorostratum is for the species' similarity to Palaquium rostratum.

Description
The bark is reddish brown. Inflorescences bear up to four flowers.

Distribution and habitat
Palaquium pseudorostratum is native to Borneo and the Philippines. Its habitat is swamp and kerangas forests.

References

pseudorostratum
Plants described in 1927
Trees of Borneo
Trees of the Philippines